8-Bit Christmas is a 2021 American Christmas comedy film directed by Michael Dowse, from a screenplay by Kevin Jakubowski based upon his novel of the same name. It stars Neil Patrick Harris, Winslow Fegley, June Diane Raphael, David Cross, and Steve Zahn. The film was released on November 24, 2021, on HBO Max, receiving generally favorable reviews from critics.

Plot
Jake Doyle (Neil Patrick Harris) recounts to his young cell phone obsessed daughter, Annie, how, as a child in the late 1980s, he got his first Nintendo Entertainment System. The movie is told in flashbacks as Jake recalls the memory of that Christmas season when all he wanted was the game console.

Timothy Keane, the richest kid in the grade, is the only kid in town with the new Nintendo entertainment system and all the latest accessories. Every day, Jake and his friends gather with the rest of the school outside of Timmy's house, where he chooses ten kids to play in his basement. Timmy even ends up getting the NES Power Glove, only to discover that the product is a bit of a joke.

Tired of pandering to Timmy for access to the coveted Nintendo, Jake dreams of getting his own system for Christmas and approaches his distracted mom and forever DIYing dad about getting one for the holidays, only to be shut down on the basis that video games are bad for your brain, and he should play outside more.

Jake's quest for a Nintendo intensifies after Timmy angrily destroys his TV after losing a game, seriously injuring his family's dog. Hearing the first prize of a Scout fundraiser for selling the most Christmas wreaths will be a Nintendo, Jake and his friends compete to sell the most wreaths and win the system.

Jake endures the humiliation of wearing girl boots, shoveling dog poop, and family shopping trips to the mall. His sister has her own desired toy, a Cabbage Patch Kids doll, and Jake agrees to drop hints on her behalf, and even accompany his father to a back alley deal to buy one of the sold out dolls, in exchange for tips on selling wreaths in the old folks' home.

The wreath sales end up being a dead end, after Timmy's father convinced the community to ban video games. The children decide to take matters into their own hands, selling baseball cards (including a rare Bill Ripken card) to pool their money, and buy a system to share. Without a ride to the mall, they concoct an elaborate plan to sneak away during the school field trip to make the purchase. Jake manages to evade parents, who are protesting video games in front of the game store, to buy the Nintendo and run back to the bus, only for the game system to be crushed by the school bus. A kind adult who sends Jake back to his field trip advises him to focus less on the presents, and more on the season of giving.

Christmas Day comes, and Jake does not receive a Nintendo. Instead, his father surprises Jake with a backyard tree fort he made himself with a trap door, ladders, and lights. Jake never got a Nintendo for Christmas, but the tree fort and his father's love for him was the better gift.

Adult Jake tells his daughter he eventually bought his own Nintendo after working all summer to earn one, and shows her the tree fort, which remains standing, reminiscing about all the good memories made, and the adventures he had because of his father's gift.

Cast
 Winslow Fegley as Young Jake Doyle 
 Neil Patrick Harris as Adult Jake Doyle
 Sophia Reid-Gantzert as Annie Doyle, Jake's daughter
 June Diane Raphael as Kathy Doyle, Jake's mother
 Steve Zahn as John Doyle, Jake's father 
 Bellaluna Resnick as Lizzy Doyle, Jake's sister 
 Che Tafari as Mikey Trotter, one of young Jake's friends 
 Santino Barnard as Evan Olsen, one of young Jake's friends who is allergic to bees and SpaghettiOs 
 Max Malas as Jeff Farmer, a kid in Jake's circle but not one of his friends and a pathological liar
 Brielle Rankins as Tammy Hodges, one of young Jake's friends who collects baseball cards, she is also Teddy's twin sister
 Cyrus Arnold as Josh Jagorski, an oversized school bully 
 Braelyn Rankins as Teddy Hodges, one of young Jake's friends and Tammy's twin brother
 Chandler Dean as Timmy Keane, a narcissistic rich kid who owns a Nintendo (NES) system and likes showing-off 
 Katia Smith as Tiffany Keane, Timmy's sister
 Tom Rooney as Dr. Timothy Keane Sr., Timmy's father who is an anti-video game advocate 
 David Cross as Dealer

Production
In March 2021, it was announced Neil Patrick Harris, Winslow Fegley, June Diane Raphael, and Steve Zahn had joined the cast of the film, with Michael Dowse directing from a screenplay by its author and executive producer Kevin Jakubowski, which appeared on the 2019 Black List. New Line Cinema and Star Thrower Entertainment produced the film, with HBO Max distributing.

Principal photography began in March 2021, in Toronto, Canada.

Release
The film was digitally released on November 24, 2021, on HBO Max.

Critical response
On review aggregator website Rotten Tomatoes, the film holds an approval rating of 83% based on 30 reviews, with an average rating of 6.9/10. The website's critics consensus reads, "For viewers seeking an undemanding and sweetly nostalgic ode to yuletide seasons past, 8-Bit Christmas boots up without a glitch." Metacritic, which uses a weighted average, assigned a score of 66 out of 100 based on five critics, indicating "generally favorable reviews".

Nick Ordoña of the Los Angeles Times praised the casting, directing, and Jakubowski's writing, summarizing: "It even earns its heart-tugging ending. In short, it's a surprise contender for Best Christmas Movie of the last several years." Calum Marsh of The New York Times wrote: "When it isn't fawning over roller rinks, Goonies posters, and Casio watches, 8 Bit Christmas is a warm and refreshingly earnest holiday comedy."

See also
 List of Christmas films

References

External links
 8-Bit Christmas on HBO Max
 

American Christmas comedy films
Films shot in Toronto
HBO Max films
Warner Bros. films
New Line Cinema films
American children's comedy films
Films about video games
Films directed by Michael Dowse
Films set in 1988
Films scored by Joseph Trapanese
2021 comedy films
2020s Christmas comedy films
2020s English-language films
Films set in Chicago
2020s American films